The Women's 1000 metres in short track speed skating at the 2018 Winter Olympics took place on 20 and 22 February 2018 at the Gangneung Ice Arena in Gangneung, South Korea.

Records
Prior to this competition, the existing world and Olympic records were as follows.

No new records were established during the competition.

Results

Heats
 Q – qualified for the quarterfinals
 ADV – advanced
 PEN – penalty
 YC – yellow card

Quarterfinals
 Q – qualified for Semifinals

Semifinals
 QA – qualified for Final A
 QB – qualified for Final B
 ADV – advanced
 PEN – penalty

Final
Final B was scratched as Kim A-lang (5th overall) was the only athlete who qualified for it. The final was held on 22 February 2018 at 20:29.

References

Women's short track speed skating at the 2018 Winter Olympics